CFN may refer to:
Canadian Football Network
Carlton Food Network, UK TV channel
Center for Functional Nanomaterials
CFN/CNBC or Class CNBC, a business and financial news TV channel in Italy
College Football News
Brazilian Marine Corps (Corpo de Fuzileiros Navais)
 Donegal Airport, Ireland, IATA code
 chemical formula of Cyanogen fluoride

 Cfn
 Craftsman (Cfn) is the term for privates in some technical branches (e.g. the Royal Electrical and Mechanical Engineers)